John Chatham (16 October 1866 – 28 February 1925) was an Australian politician.

He was born in Napoleons to farmer James Chatham and Margaret Hanlon. He worked in various sawmills and as a contractor before buying land at Rokewood Junction and becoming a leading wheat farmer. On 25 August 1897 he married Ellen McGrath, with whom he had four children. He was elected to the Victorian Legislative Assembly at a by-election in 1913, representing Grenville as a member of the Labor Party. He was expelled for supporting conscription in the 1916 Labor split, and did not run for re-election in 1917. Chatham died in 1925 in Ballarat.

References

1866 births
1925 deaths
Australian Labor Party members of the Parliament of Victoria
Nationalist Party of Australia members of the Parliament of Victoria
Members of the Victorian Legislative Assembly